The Assyrian Evangelical Church is a Presbyterian church in the Middle East that attained a status of ecclesiastical independence from the Presbyterian mission in Iran in 1870.

Members

Its members are predominantly ethnic Assyrians, an Eastern Aramaic speaking Semitic people who are indigenous to Upper Mesopotamia (what had been Assyria between the 25th century BCE and 7th century CE), and descendants of the ancient Assyrians. (see Assyria, Assyrian continuity and Assyrian people).

Most Assyrian Evangelicals (as well as members of the Assyrian Pentecostal Church), before conversion to Protestantism, had initially been members of the Assyrian Church of the East; its later 18th century offshoot, the Chaldean Catholic Church; or the Syriac Orthodox Church. The vast majority of ethnic Assyrians remain adherents of these ancient Eastern Rite churches to this day.

Locations
There are several Assyrian Evangelical churches in the diaspora, e.g. in San Jose, Sydney, Melbourne, Turlock, and Chicago. There are also a few in Lebanon and as well as in Jordan, although Arabic services are more common in these countries.

Incidents
In 2010, Iranian Assyrian pastor Wilson Issavi was arrested in Kermanshah and detained for 54 days for allegedly attempting to convert Muslims to Christianity. Whilst in prison, Issavi was allegedly tortured as he had bruises and marks from beatings on his body.

References

External links
Assyrian Evangelical Church of  Tehran
Assyrian Evangelical Church of San Jose

 
1870 establishments in Iran
Evangelical denominations in Asia